Dan Arnold Killian (February 5, 1880 – January 15, 1953) was an American college football and college baseball coach. He served as the head football coach at Louisiana State University (LSU) from 1904 to 1906, compiling a record of 8–6–2. Killian was also the head coach of the LSU baseball team from 1905 to 1906 (tallying a mark of 14–9), as well as head coach of the LSU Tigers track and field team from 1905 to 1906. He also served as athletic director.

Killian was a graduate of the University of Michigan, where he lettered as a shortstop in baseball in 1902. He also reportedly played quarterback on the football team, but if he did, he apparently did not qualify for a letter.

In 1906 he left coaching "to do sporting work for a newspaper" in Chicago.

He died in Lansing, Michigan in 1953.

Head coaching record

Football

Baseball

References

External links
 

1880 births
1953 deaths
College track and field coaches in the United States
LSU Tigers football coaches
LSU Tigers baseball coaches
LSU Tigers and Lady Tigers track and field coaches
LSU Tigers and Lady Tigers athletic directors
University of Michigan alumni
People from Allegan, Michigan
Coaches of American football from Michigan
Baseball coaches from Michigan